Bryan Drew (born 23 January 1971) is a South African cricketer. He played in nineteen first-class and two List A matches for Boland from 1992/93 and 1998/99.

See also
 List of Boland representative cricketers

References

External links
 

1971 births
Living people
South African cricketers
Boland cricketers
Cricketers from Durban